Jack Kerley is an American author. He spent 20 years in an advertising career before writing his first book. He lives in Newport, Kentucky, and is married with two children.

Writing
Jack Kerley is the author of the Carson Ryder novels, with the thirteenth installment appearing in 2017. His short stories are "Almost There", published in Southern Review, Spring 2004, University of Louisiana Press, and "A Season of Moles", published in Stories from the Blue Moon Café III: Anthology of Southern Writers, McAdam/Cage, 2004, ed. Sonny Brewer. Kerley's books have been translated into ten languages and published primarily in England now.

Books

Carson Ryder series

The Hundredth Man; E.P. Dutton; 320 pp.  (hardcover)
The Death Collectors; E.P. Dutton; 320 pp.  (hardcover)
 (Japan) Best Foreign Mystery of the Decade (2000-2009)
The Broken Souls or A Garden Of Vipers (USA); E.P.Dutton; 334 pp.  (hardcover)
Blood Brother; HarperCollins; 
In the Blood
Little Girls Lost; HarperCollins; 400 pp. 
Buried Alive
Her Last Scream
The Killing Game
The Death Box
The Memory Killer
The Apostle
The Death File
Buried Alive

References

External links
Jack Kerley Official Website

Year of birth missing (living people)
Living people
American mystery writers
Novelists from Kentucky
American male novelists